Thymios Karakatsanis (8 December 1940 – 30 June 2012) was a Greek actor with a notable career in theatre. He was born in Piraeus on 8 December 1940. He studied at Art Theatre of Karolos Koun. His first professional role was in the play Thyrida of Tardieu in 1963. He appeared in a few films but he became well known mainly from his roles in the plays of Aristophanes. He played the role of Lysistrata three times. He appeared frequently at theatre of Ancient Epidavros. In 1978, he founded the group New Greek Stage and he presented famous plays, starting with the play Von Dimitrakis of Dimitris Psathas. In 1987 he won a theatre award for his role in Death of a Salesman of Arthur Miller. In the same period he also worked as a radio presenter. The play Death of a Salesman was his last role. He died on 30 June 2012 at the age of 72 years.

Filmography

Cinema
To pio lampro asteri (1967)
I hartorihtra (1967)
Boum Taratatzoum (1972)
I Gynaikokratia (1973) 
La faille (1975) 
Oi Ntantades (1979) 
idou i Rodos (1979)
Karavan Sarai (1986)

Theatre
Plutus by Aristophanes
Peace by Aristophanes
The Frogs by Aristophanes
The Birds by Aristophanes
Lysistrata by Aristophanes
 The Clouds by Aristophanes
Tartuffe by Molière
Death of a Salesman by Arthur Miller
Von Dimitrakis by Dimitris Psathas
The Sunshine Boys by Neil Simon
The Good Soldier Švejk by Jaroslav Hašek

References

External links

1940 births
2012 deaths
Greek male film actors
Greek male stage actors
20th-century Greek male actors
Actors from Piraeus